The 2018 RAN Women’s 10s was the third edition of the women's rugby tens tournament that was hosted by Mexico at Mexico City from July 12th to 13th. USA South were undefeated in the tournament, they eventually won the championship after beating Jamaica 19–12 in the final.

Table

Matches

Day 1

Day 2

Finals

References 

Women's rugby union competitions for national teams
Rugby union competitions in North America
Rugby union competitions in the Caribbean
Women's rugby union in North America
2018 in North American rugby union
RAN Women's Rugby